The men's 1500 metres event at the 1972 European Athletics Indoor Championships was held on 12 March in Grenoble.

Results

References

1500 metres at the European Athletics Indoor Championships
1500